Teotl is a Nahuatl term for sacredness or divinity that is sometimes translated as "god". For the Aztecs  was the metaphysical omnipresence upon which their religious philosophy was based.

As described by James Maffie,  "is essentially power: continually active, actualized, and actualizing energy-in-motion... It is an ever-continuing process, like a flowing river... It continually and continuously generates and regenerates as well as permeates, encompasses and shapes reality as part of an endless process. It creates the cosmos and all its contents from within itself as well as out of itself."

This is conceptualized in a kind of monistic pantheism as manifest in the supreme god , as well as a large pantheon of lesser gods and idealizations of natural phenomena such as stars and fire.

Such immaterial energy can also be compared to the Polynesian concept of Mana. In Pipil mythology  (Nawat cognate of Teotl) is known as the creator and father of life.

References

Sources

External links
 Discussion on the Internet Encyclopedia of Philosophy

Aztec mythology and religion
Vitalism